Yunnan People’s Publishing House  is a publishing company based in Kunming, Yunnan, China, established on December 25, 1950. It is the only general publishing company of Yunnan Province.

References

External links

Book publishing companies of China
Publishing companies established in 1950
Companies based in Kunming